Benedikte Shetelig Kruse (born 20 December 1979 in Oslo, Norway) is a Norwegian singer and actor, daughter of Professor of music, Gro Shetelig Kruse, and the Composer Bjørn Kruse. She is the sister of actress and singers Jannike and Anine Kruse.

Career 
Kruse studied music at the Foss videregående skole, and is a graduated singer and singing teacher from the Norwegian Academy of Music, with experience from theater and television. She has worked with educational music programs for children and youth together with Anja Eline Skybakmoen. In 2004 together with Ane Carmen Roggen, she sang the choir on the record Nomadesongar with Lars Klevstrand.

Together with her sister Anine Kruse, Anja Eline Skybakmoen, Ane Carmen Roggen and Ida Roggen she comprises the vocal group Pitsj. and has also done many dubbing jobs. In 2011 she performed the Show Pitsj & Gumbo at the Oslo Concert Hall, where "A capella møter en hot New Orleans-rett" (A capella meets a hot New Orleans Dish).

In January 2014, the Kruse sisters celebrated music with a New Year Show, getting excellent recipient in the local press.

Discography 
1992: Wenches Jul (CNR Records), with Wenche Myhre
2004: Nomadesongar (Tylden & Co), with Lars Klevstrand
2005: Distant Shores (Everyday Records), with Trond Teigen'
2005: Rain (Everyday Records), with Paal Flaata
2006: Pitsj (Grappa), within Pitsj
2009: Gjenfortellinger (Grappa), within Pitsj
2009: Edvard Grieg in jazz mood (Universal Music, 2009), Pitsj with Kjell Karlsen ("I Dovregubbens hall")
2009: Med Andre Ord (DnC), with Jannike Kruse
2009: Autographs (EMC Classic), with Otto Graf
2010: 16 Sanger Til Maneten Medusa (Schmell), with Åshild Watne
2014: Snow Is Falling (Grappa Music)

References

External links 
Pitsj website

Norwegian women jazz singers
Musicians from Oslo
Norwegian Academy of Music alumni
Academic staff of the Norwegian Academy of Music
1979 births
Living people
20th-century Norwegian women singers
20th-century Norwegian singers
21st-century Norwegian women singers
21st-century Norwegian singers
Pitsj members